Peter Boroffka (May 14, 1932 – December 24, 1999) was a German politician of the Christian Democratic Union (CDU) and former member of the German Bundestag.

Life 
Boroffka joined the CDU in 1960. From 1971 to 1985 Boroffka was a member of the Berlin House of Representatives. On 6 October 1981, he was sent to the German Bundestag as a Berlin member of parliament, succeeding Franz Amrehn. He resigned from the Bundestag in 1987.

Literature

References

1932 births
1999 deaths
Members of the Bundestag for Berlin
Members of the Bundestag 1983–1987
Members of the Bundestag 1980–1983
Members of the Bundestag for the Christian Democratic Union of Germany
Members of the Abgeordnetenhaus of Berlin